Stylochyrus is a genus of mites in the family Ologamasidae.

Species
 Stylochyrus ampulliger (Berlese, 1908)
 Stylochyrus communis (Nikolsky, 1981)
 Stylochyrus fimetarius (J. Müller, 1859) 
 Stylochyrus giganteus (Willmann, 1938) 
 Stylochyrus hemisphaericus (C. L. Koch, 1842)
 Stylochyrus heterochaetum (Nikolsky, 1981)
 Stylochyrus insolentis (Ma-Liming, 1997)
 Stylochyrus ovatum (Berlese, 1892)
 Stylochyrus rarior (Berlese, 1916) 
 Stylochyrus rovennensis (G. Canestrini & R. Canestrini, 1882)
 Stylochyrus verrucosa (Nikolskij, 1990)

References

Ologamasidae